Carbonell is a surname of Catalan origin. Known individuals with the Carbonell last name include:
Alberto Carbonell (born 1993), Valencian football defender 
Álex Carbonell (born 1997), Spanish football midfielder
Alfredo Carbonell Debali (born 1899), Uruguayan lawyer and diplomat
Antonio Carbonell (born 1969), Spanish singer-songwriter 
Agustín Carbonell (born 1967), Spanish guitarist and composer of flamenco music
Carmen Carbonell (1900–1988), Spanish stage and film actress
Daniel Carbonell, Cuban baseball player
Eudald Carbonell (born 1953), Catalan archaeologist, anthropologist and paleontologist
Francinaina Cirer Carbonell (1781–1855), Spanish Roman Catholic venerated Christian
Guidette Carbonell (1910–2008), French artist
Isaac Carbonell (born 1994), Catalan racing cyclist
Isabelle Carbonell, American documentary photographer and filmmaker
Jaime Carbonell (born 1953), Uruguayan-born computer scientist at Carnegie Mellon University
Joaquín Carbonell (1947–2020), Spanish singer-songwriter and journalist 
Jordi Carbonell (1924–2016), Spanish politician
Josefina Carbonell, official of the U.S. Department of Health and Human Services
Josep Carbonell (born 1957), Spanish sprinter
Juan Carlos Carbonell (born 1970), Chilean open wheel race-car driver
Lorenzo Carbonell Santacruz (1883—1968), mayor of Alicante, Spain
Loreto Carbonell (1933–2017), Filipino basketball player
 Luis Carbonell Parra (1924-2015), Venezuelan scientist.
Manuel Carbonell (born 1918), Cuban sculptor
Carbonell Awards in South Florida
María Gómez Carbonell (1903–1988), Cuban educator and attorney
Miguel Ángel Carbonell Argentine football player
Miquel Carbonell Selva (1854–1896), Catalan painter, muralist and poet
Nestor  Carbonell (born 1967), American actor
Ona Carbonell (born 1990), Catalan synchronized swimmer
Pere Miquel Carbonell (1434–1517), Catalan historian, humanist, notary, calligrapher, poet and writer
Peris Carbonell (born 1957), Valencian painter and sculptor 
Ponç Carbonell (died c. 1320), Catalan Franciscan scholar 
Rafael Carbonell (born 1943), Cuban boxer
Raulito Carbonell, Puerto Rican actor, comedian, singer and lawyer
Teresa Gisbert Carbonell (born 1926), Bolivian art historian and architect
Tomás Carbonell (1621–1692), Spanish friar of the Dominican Order
Tomás Carbonell (born 1968), Catalan tennis player

See also
 Carbonnelle

Catalan-language surnames